is a Japanese josei manga series written and illustrated by Mari Ozawa. With the theme of the family dining table, it depicts the daily life and growth of high school boys, their families and friends who have awakened to cooking. It was published by Kodansha from 2010 to 2017, with serialization on Kiss magazine and with 17 volumes compiling the chapters. A Japanese television drama series adaptation, Ashita mo Kitto, Oishii Gohan ~Gin no Spoon~, aired from June 1
to July 31, 2015.

Characters
Ritsu (Mahiro Takasugi)
Kyōko (Yasuko Tomita)
Shirabe
Kanade

Volumes
1 (February 10, 2011)
2 (June 13, 2011)
3 (December 13, 2011)
4 (April 13, 2012)
5 (September 13, 2012)
6 (January 11, 2013)
7 (June 13, 2013)
8 (December 13, 2013)
9 (April 11, 2014)
10 (September 12, 2014)
11 (April 13, 2015)
12 (June 12, 2015) 
13 (December 11, 2015)
14 (May 13, 2016)
15 (October 13, 2016)
16 (April 13, 2017)
17 (November 13, 2017)

References

External links
Ashita mo Kitto, Oishii Gohan ~Gin no Spoon~ on tokai-tv.com 

2015 Japanese television series debuts
Fuji TV dramas
Josei manga
Kodansha manga